Qeshlaq-e Sari Quyi Shahmar (also Romanized as Qeshlāq-e Sārī Qūyī Shāhmār) is a village in Qeshlaq-e Gharbi Rural District, Aslan Duz District, Parsabad County, Ardabil Province, Iran. At the 2006 census, its population was 204, in 35 families.

References 

Towns and villages in Parsabad County